Moro Plantation House is located in Tensas Parish, Louisiana.  It is just north of Louisiana Highway 566, three miles west of U.S. 65 & three and one half miles west of Waterproof, Louisiana.  It was built in about 1839 and was added to the National Register of Historic Places in 1982.

It is a two-story Greek Revival plantation house in delta farmland facing Muddy Bayou near the Mississippi River.  It was built as a central hall plan with brick on the ground floor and frame construction on the upper story.  It has "outstanding interior woodwork", the finest in the parish, in its four upper story main rooms.

References

Houses on the National Register of Historic Places in Louisiana
Houses completed in 1839
Houses in Tensas Parish, Louisiana
National Register of Historic Places in Tensas Parish, Louisiana
Plantations in Louisiana